Miguel Simpson (born 25 September 1955) is a Costa Rican footballer. He competed in the men's tournament at the 1984 Summer Olympics.

References

External links
 
 

1955 births
Living people
Costa Rican footballers
Costa Rica international footballers
Olympic footballers of Costa Rica
Footballers at the 1984 Summer Olympics
Place of birth missing (living people)
Association football defenders
A.D. San Carlos footballers